Killer Klowns from Outer Space is an EP by American punk rock band The Dickies. It was released in 1988 by Enigma Records. It contains the song "Killer Klowns," the title song of the 1988 film Killer Klowns from Outer Space.

South Californian artist Shag designed and executed the album cover artwork, the first of various collaborations with The Dickies.

Critical reception
Trouser Press wrote that "included on this fun (if less than inspired) release is a gimmicky remake of Jet Screamer’s Jetsons rockabilly classic 'Eep Opp Ork (Uh, Uh),' one more item in the Dickies’ ever-expanding catalog of daffy covers."

Track listing

Album credits

Personnel
Jerry Angel - drums
Lori Buhne - bass guitar, vocal
Enoch Hain / Bob Lansing (son of famous actor Robert Lansing) - guitars, vocals
Stan Lee - guitars
Cliff Martinez - drums, Spirit Channel For George Jetson
Leonard Graves Phillips - vocals, keyboards, Spirit Channel for Bela Lugosi
Alisa Wood - background vocals
Sir. Ronald Powell Hitchcock - engineering

References

The Dickies albums
1988 EPs